DSB MY 1201 and 1202 were two diesel locomotives built by Frichs in Aarhus, Denmark in 1957 and 1960.

The locomotives were built by Frichs with a diesel engine produced by Burmeister & Wain, while Thrige-Titan delivered the electric equipment. In 1957 the first locomotive, MY 1201, was delivered followed by the second, MY 1202, in 1960. Due to the curved forms of the locomotives the first locomotive was named Marilyn Monroe. The production of the second experienced severe delays and was named My Fair Lady after the opera which also premiered at the time after numerous delays. The locomotives were unstable and error-prone and spent longer being serviced than in operation. They were in operation until 1969 after which they were retired in 1969 and scrapped in 1971.

Units

References 

Diesel locomotives of Denmark
DSB (railway company) locomotives
Frichs locomotives
Railway locomotives introduced in 1957
Standard gauge locomotives of Denmark